Fazlul Haque Montu (died on November 20, 2020) was a Bangladeshi politician, Freedom Fighter and trade unionist.

Biography
He was a member of the Awami League and president of its Pabna District unit. He was also involved in trade union politics for more than 45 years and in 2019 was elected president of the Awami League's trade union wing, the Jatiya Sramik League. He had formerly been an independent member of the Minimum Wage Board of Bangladesh's garment industry.

Montu died in Dhaka at the age of 71 due to complications brought on by COVID-19.

References

Place of birth missing
1952 births
2020 deaths
Deaths from the COVID-19 pandemic in Bangladesh
Bangladeshi trade unionists
Bangladeshi politicians
Awami League politicians
People from Pabna District